The Cordillera Blanca Batholith is an extensive group of individual plutons that crop out near or at Cordillera Blanca, Peru. The batholith intrudes the Jurassic Chicama Formation. To the west the Cordillera Blanca Fault makes up the border of the batholith. It has been suggested that the magma that originated the batholith was the product of partial melting of underplated basaltic crust.

References

See also
Casma Group
Coastal Batholith of Peru

Batholiths of South America
Geology of Peru